Leibniz's rule (named after Gottfried Wilhelm Leibniz) may refer to one of the following:

 Product rule in differential calculus
 General Leibniz rule, a generalization of the product rule
 Leibniz integral rule
 The alternating series test, also called Leibniz's rule

See also
Leibniz (disambiguation)
Leibniz' law (disambiguation)
 List of things named after Gottfried Leibniz